The Ardlamont Murder (also known as the Ardlamont Mystery and the Monson Case), which took place in Argyll, Scotland, on 10 August 1893, gave rise to two high-profile court cases: a murder trial in Edinburgh (HM Advocate v Monson), and a defamation trial in London (Monson v Tussauds Ltd) the following year.

Alfred John Monson received the Scottish verdict of "not proven" in his High Court of Justiciary trial for the murder of Cecil Hambrough.  Then, in 1894, he sued Madame Tussauds for libel and was awarded one farthing (the lowest possible amount at the time) in damages.  The case established the principle of "libel by innuendo" in English law, and Monson v Tussauds Ltd has been used to draw up defamation laws in many countries since.

A notorious case at the time, the trial received renewed attention when it was noted that Joseph Bell, revealed as the inspiration for the popular fictional character Sherlock Holmes, had been called as an expert witness at the murder trial, as was another inspiration for Holmes, Dr. Henry Littlejohn, who was a medical forensic expert for the Crown.

Background
Alfred John Monson was born in 1860 the son of Reverend Thomas John Monson and his wife the Hon. Caroline Isabella Monckton, daughter of the 5th Viscount Galway. He married Agnes Maude Day in 1881.

Windsor Dudley Cecil Hambrough, born 1873, was a member of the Hambrough family of Pipewell Hall, Northamptonshire and Steephill, Isle of Wight.

Monson began working as a gentleman's tutor for the Hambrough family in 1891. In 1893 he took the lease on the Ardlamont estate in Argyll for the shooting season.  His pupil, Windsor Dudley Cecil Hambrough, now 20-year-old joined him there; he had been living with Monson, his wife and three children at Risley Hall, Yorkshire for his education (where it later emerged, he had been having an illicit relationship with Mrs Monson). On 10 August, he took Hambrough a day's hunting in an area of woodland. A third man joined them, Edward Scott, a friend of Monson (who claimed to be a boating engineer, but also had an alias Edward Sweeney, or Ted Davis as a bookmaker) had arrived at the estate a few days earlier.

Estate workers heard a shot, then saw Monson and Scott running to Ardlamont House carrying the guns. They were cleaning the weapons when the estate butler asked what had become of Mr Hambrough. Monson replied that he had shot himself in the head by accident while climbing a fence or wall.

Investigation and trial
When the incident was reported, a member of the Inveraray procurator fiscal's office was sent to the estate. He returned, saying it had been a tragic accident. There was not any formal post mortem. However, two weeks later, Monson appeared at the fiscal's office to report that Hambrough had taken out two life insurance policies worth £20,000 only six days before he died, and that they were made out in the name of Monson’s wife. These had been brokered by Arthur Sebright, a mortgage and insurance broker friend of Monson, who had met them earlier that year and discussed possible life insurance and trust deeds, and also joint financial ventures to take effect after Hambrough reached his majority (age 21) when he was due to inherit £200,000. After thorough searches of the estate and interviews with staff, Monson was charged with murder. Scott, now on the run, was named as his accomplice.

Among the witnesses for the prosecution was Joseph Bell, the Edinburgh surgeon and forensic detective. He told the jury that, in his opinion, Monson had murdered Cecil Hambrough. Henry Littlejohn and Patrick Heron Watson agreed the shot could not be self-inflicted. However, sufficient doubt had been sowed in the minds of the jury by Monson's advocate John Comrie Thomson, who presented Prof Matthew Hay as an expert witness who strongly contradicted the other experts, and Monson was set free with the verdict of "not proven."

Hambrough was buried in the churchyard at St Catherine's Church, Ventnor on the Isle of Wight, close to the family home.

Libel by innuendo

In 1894 Madame Tussauds in London erected a waxwork of Monson at the entrance to its Chamber of Horrors, bearing a gun. Monson took exception, sued the company and was awarded one farthing in damages. The case, Monson v Tussauds, established the principle of "libel by innuendo", which has been used to draw up defamation laws in many countries since. To prove libel, there must be publication in permanent form, but this need not be in words.

Television Dramatisation 
BBC Scotland Television produced an adaptation based on the case and broadcast in 1984. Murder Not Proven: Open Season was scripted by the future novelist Peter May.

References

High Court of Justiciary cases
1893 in Scotland
1893 in case law
English tort case law
1894 in England
1894 in case law
History of Argyll and Bute
Murder in Scotland
Clan Lamont
1893 in British law
1894 in British law
August 1893 events
1893 murders in the United Kingdom